Gian Luca Schulz (born 14 January 1999) is a German professional footballer who plays as a right winger or attacking midfielder for Hansa Rostock II.

Early life
Schulz was born in Berlin.

Career
After playing youth football for Tennis Borussia Berlin and Union Berlin, and senior football for Union Fürstenwalde in the Regionalliga Nordost, he joined Hansa Rostock on a two-year contract in July 2020.

Personal life
He is the brother of fellow professional footballer and German international Nico Schulz. He is eligible to represent Italy internationally through his father.

References

External links
 
 

1999 births
Living people
German footballers
German people of Italian descent
Association football wingers
Association football midfielders
FSV Union Fürstenwalde players
FC Hansa Rostock players
FC Energie Cottbus players
3. Liga players
Regionalliga players
Oberliga (football) players
Footballers from Berlin